Muhajir cuisine refers to the food and culinary style of the Muhajir people in Pakistan, Muslim immigrants originally from India who migrated to Pakistan following the partition of India. Most Muhajirs have traditionally been based in Karachi, hence the city being known for Muhajir tastes in its cuisine. This cuisine has a rich tradition of many distinct and local ways of cooking. Muhajirs clung to their old established habits and tastes, including a numberless variety of dishes and beverages.

This cuisine has been greatly affected by the urban culture of Muhajirs, and the Muhajir culinary dishes are mostly prepared by modern cooking appliances.

Origins 
Muhajir cuisine is originally a blend of Uttar Pradesh, Bengali, Delhi, Hyderabadi, Bihari and Rajasthani cuisines. It is mostly the same as the cuisine of North Indian populations who adopted it from the Mughals.

Style of cooking 
There are many styles of cooking used by Muhajirs. Modern methods such as cooking on gas cookers are the most famous. Tandoori style of cooking involves use of the tandoor. The Tandoori style is mostly used by Muhajirs from Rajasthan, Delhi and Agra where the tandoor is thought to be originated. A tandoor may be used to bake many different types of flatbread. Some of the most common are tandoori roti, tandoori naan, tandoori laccha paratha, missi roti, laffa, and tandoori kulcha.

Distinguishable features 
The Mughal and Indo-Iranian heritage played an influential role in the making of their cuisine, having taste vary from mild to spicy and is often associated with aroma. In comparison to other native Pakistani dishes, Muhajir cuisine tends to use stronger spices and flavors. Most of a dastarkhawan dining table include chapatti, rice, dal, vegetable and meat curry. Special dishes include biryani, qorma, kofta, seekh kabab, Nihari and Haleem, Nargisi Koftay, Kata-Kat, Rogani Naan, Naan, Sheer-qurma (sweet), qourma, Chai, paan and Hyderabadi cuisine, and other delicacies associated with Muhajir culture. Nihari, the national dish of Pakistan was brought to Pakistan by the Muhajir people from India.

References

 
Pakistani cuisine